Arun Kumar Ahuja (born Gulshan Singh Ahuja 17 January 1917 – 3 July 1998), popularly known as Aroon, was an Indian actor and producer who was active in Hindi cinema in the 1940s and early 1950s, appearing in over 30 films in both leading and supporting roles. He was perhaps best known for appearing in Mehboob Khan's 1940 film Aurat which was the predecessor of the Oscar nominated 1957 remake Mother India. He was married to singer and actress Nirmala Devi and is the father of actor Govinda.

Career 
Ahuja was discovered in Lahore when director Mehboob Khan was looking for new talent and Ahuja was among the people auditioning. Khan selected Ahuja and cast him in the leading role for his 1939 film Ek Hi Raasta for Sagar Movietone.  He went on to act in over 30 films throughout the 1940s and early 1950s playing leading and supporting roles for film banners such as National Studios, Ranjit Studios and Sagar Movietone. He also sang in most of his films as was the tradition in those days before professional singers were used for playback singing

In 1940, he played perhaps his most well known role in Mehboob Khan's Aurat where he acted opposite Sardar Akhtar. This film was later remade as the more famous and well known blockbuster Mother India (1957). He was paired with actresses such as Shobhana Samarth, Monica Desai and Khursheed Bano throughout his career. He made a popular pairing with his wife Nirmala Devi in several films such as Savera (1942), Chalis Karod (1946) and Ghunghat (1946).

In 1948, he set up his own production company named Arun Productions and produced and starred in the film Sehra. Sehra was a box office failure and Ahuja suffered financial losses due to which his career went into decline. He produced another film named Jo Hai Saajan which was never released.

By the early 1950s, film offers were drying up and he quit the film industry after his last film appearance in Aulad (1954).  The losses Ahuja suffered from his home productions resulted in him selling off his Bungalow in Mumbai's Carter Road in Bandra and shifting his entire family to a chawl in Virar. His health failed during this time and his wife Nirmala had to work as a singer on radio and touring concerts to provide for the family of three daughters and two sons.

Arun lived a reclusive life after leaving the film industry and died in 1998 at the age of 81 of a heart attack.

Personal life & family 
Ahuja was born as Gulshan Singh Ahuja in Gujranwala, Punjab, present-day Pakistan in 1917. He took a degree in engineering at a college in Lahore in 1937. 

In 1942, he married singer and actress Nirmala Devi, whom he met after they were cast opposite each other in the film Savera. They were married until Nirmala's death in 1996. Together they had three daughters named Pushpa, Padma and Kamini. Their sons are actor/director Kirti Kumar and actor Govinda. After an acting career that spanned 15 years, Ahuja quit acting in 1954 and suffered from poor health after the failure of his home production. The losses he suffered led to him selling off his Bungalow in Mumbai and move to a chawl in Virar. His wife had to provide for the family by singing and touring concerts.

His youngest son Govinda would go on to become a successful actor decades later in the 1980s and 1990s and his other son Kirti Kumar became a director and occasional actor. Several of his grandchildren would go on to become actors in the film and television industry including Vinay Anand, Krishna Abhishek, Ragini Khanna, Aarti Singh, Soumya Seth and Tina Ahuja. His daughter Padma is the mother of Krishna and Aarti and died in the early 1980s soon after giving birth to Aarti. His eldest daughter Pushpa who is the mother of Vinay Anand, died in 2011 aged 68.

Selected filmography 
Ek Hi Raasta (1939)
Bhole Bhale (1939)
Aurat (1940)
Azad (1940)
Civil Marriage (1940)
Bambai Ki Sair (1941)
Beti (1941)
Kanchan (1941)
Patola (1942)
Savera (1942)
Return of Toofan Mail (1942)
Andhera (1943)
Shankar Parvati (1943)
Chhoti Maa (1943)
Bhanwara (1944)
Caravan (1944)
Bhartrahari (1944)
Amrapali (1945)
Chalis Karod (1946)
Khooni (1946)
Ghunghat (1946)
Samaj Ko Badal Do (1947)
Mera Suhaag (1948)
Sehra (1948) (Also Producer)
Usha Haran (1949)
Sudhar (1949)
Shaadi Ki Raat (1950)
Jai Mahalaxshmi (1951)
Kashmir (1951)
Aulad (1954)
Ref -

References

External links 

1917 births
1998 deaths
Male actors in Hindi cinema
20th-century Indian male actors
Hindi film producers
Punjabi people
People from Gujranwala District